Herbert Edward Jones (6 April 1861 – 19/20 February 1920) was an English clergyman, the second Suffragan Bishop of Lewes and Archdeacon of Chichester.

Biography 
The second son of Sir Willoughby Jones, 3rd Baronet, he was educated at Eton College and Trinity College, Cambridge, ordained in 1884 and began his career with a curacy at St Andrews, Westminster. He was then successively the incumbent at Knebworth, Petworth and Hitchin before ascending being appointed Archdeacon of Chichester and ordinated as Suffragan Bishop of Lewes in 1914, posts he held until his death, after a long illness, at Hove on 20 February 1920.

Notes

External links

1861 births
People educated at Eton College
Alumni of Trinity College, Cambridge
Archdeacons of Chichester
20th-century Church of England bishops
Bishops of Lewes
1920 deaths
Younger sons of baronets